Baytona is a small rural community found in Newfoundland and Labrador. It is situated off of Route 340, which runs from Lewisporte to Twillingate island, aptly named "Road to the Isles". A bay separates Baytona from a neighboring town called Birchy Bay. The first settlers of Baytona were fishermen, with women mainly staying home to raise children; however, with a depletion in cod stocks and lobsters, there was a shift away from the fishing industry.

Baytona has a fire department, town council and a recreation committee. There is currently one running convenience store. The community has a playground, and a basketball court.

The town also has an Anglican and a Pentecostal church.

Demographics 

Name change
Originally, Baytona was known as "Birchy Bay North". In 1958 the name was changed to "Gayside" to help the flow of mail delivery. The name was a play on the word "gay", which at that time meant happy, implying that Gayside was the more pleasant of the two communities. However, in 1985, due to a change in definition of the word "gay", and subsequent joking and harassment of neighbouring communities, the name of the town was, once again, changed from "Gayside" to "Baytona".

References

Towns in Newfoundland and Labrador